Concordancia may refer to:

 Concordance (Bolivia), a former political alliance in Bolivia
 Concordancia (Argentina), a former political alliance in Argentina